Part One (Part I) is a compilation of laws pertaining to the Constitution of Albania, that consists of fourteen articles. This part of the Constitution is the first of eighteen parts.

Part I of the Constitution defines Albania as a unitary parliamentary republic as well as a secular state, in which elections are free, equal and periodic. As of the Constitution, the Republic of Albania is obligatory to protect the rights of the Albanian people in the country and abroad. Article 15 of Part I states the official language of the country is the Albanian language.

Basic Principles

See also 
 Politics of Albania

References 

1
Politics of Albania